Climate is the long-term weather pattern in a region.

Climate or Climates may also refer to:

 Climate, an interchangeable part of an astrolabe, an ancient astronomical instrument
 Climates (film), a 2006 Turkish drama
 Climates (band), a British melodic hardcore band formed in 2011

See also

 Climate change (disambiguation)
 Clime, a divisions of the earth by latitude in classical Greco-Roman geography and astronomy
 Organisation climate
 Political climate